The Old Taiwan dollar was in use from 1946 to 1949, beginning shortly after Taiwan's handover from Japan to the Republic of China. The currency was issued by the Bank of Taiwan. Hyperinflation prompted the introduction of the New Taiwan dollar in June 1949, shortly before the Nationalist evacuation from mainland China in December.

History

Taiwan was under Japanese rule from 1895 to 1945 and the colonial government of Taiwan issued Taiwanese yen during this period through the Bank of Taiwan. In 1945, after the Japanese Empire was defeated in World War II, Taiwan was handed over to the Republic of China (ROC). Within a year, the Nationalist government assumed control of the Bank of Taiwan and issued Taiwan dollars (also known as Taiwan Nationalist yuan or TWN) as a "provisional" replacement for the Taiwan yen at the rate of one to one. The new banknotes were initially printed in Shanghai, and were shipped to Taipei. After the Nationalists consolidated their control over Taiwan the banknotes were printed in Taipei. The currency was not subdivided (no cents), and no coins were issued.

Due to the Chinese Civil War in the late 1940s, Taiwan, like China, suffered from hyperinflation. As inflation worsened, the government issued banknotes at higher and higher denominations, up to one million yuan. Because the inflation of the Taiwan dollar was only a side effect of the inflation of the then Chinese yuan of mainland China, it depreciated at a slower rate than the currency used on the mainland.

The Taiwan dollar was replaced by the New Taiwan dollar on 15 June 1949, at the rate of 1 new dollar to 40,000 old dollars. The Nationalists were defeated by the Communists in December of the same year and retreated to Taiwan. The government then declared in the Temporary Provisions Effective During the Period of Communist Rebellion that dollars issued by the Bank of Taiwan would become the new currency in circulation.

Banknotes
The denominations of the Old Taiwan dollar in circulation were:

See also

 Economy of Taiwan
 History of Taiwan
 History of the Republic of China
 Political status of Taiwan
 New Taiwan dollar

References

External links 

Currencies of Asia
Modern obsolete currencies
Economic history of Taiwan
1946 establishments in Taiwan
1949 disestablishments in Taiwan
1940s economic history